Education City is a development in Al Rayyan, Qatar. Developed by the Qatar Foundation, the  property houses various educational facilities, including satellite campuses of eight international universities.

History
Education City was launched by Qatar Foundation in 1997. The same year, Virginia Commonwealth University became the first institute to establish itself on its campus. The city was officially inaugurated in 2003.

Over the past 20 years, Education City has grown from a single school to a multi university campus with students from over 50 countries and an enormous research fund, offering significant opportunities for the advancement of knowledge and research across a variety of disciplines.

In the last five years Education City has transformed itself into a full-fledged community adding a 219-bedroom Premier Inn Hotel, a 33-hole Golf Course called Education City Golf Club, Qatar National Library and Oxygen Park.

Institutions

Universities
Six American universities, one British university and one French university have branch campuses at Education City. It also has one local university. These are as follows:
 Virginia Commonwealth University in Qatar School of the Arts (VCUarts Qatar). Established in 1998, VCUarts Qatar was the first international partner university to open in Education City. VCUarts Qatar offers degrees in fashion design, graphic design, interior design and painting and printmaking, a Bachelor of Arts degree in art history, and a Master of Fine Arts degree in design. A total of 680 students have graduated from VCUarts Qatar.
 Weill Cornell Medicine - Qatar (WCM-Q). WCM-Q was established in 2001 as a partnership between Cornell University and Qatar Foundation. WCM-Q's innovative six-year program of studies leads to the Cornell University MD degree. A total of 335 students have graduated from WCM-Q.
 Texas A&M University at Qatar (TAMUQ). TAMUQ's campus was established in 2003. The university offers Bachelor of Science degrees in Chemical Engineering, Electrical Engineering, Mechanical Engineering, and Petroleum Engineering. The university began offering graduate degree programs in Chemical Engineering in 2011. Over 1,000 students have graduated from TAMUQ.
 Carnegie Mellon University in Qatar (CMU-Q). CMU-Q joined Education City in 2004. CMU-Q offers undergraduate programs in Biological Sciences, Business Administration, Computational Biology, Computer Science, and Information Systems. With 10 graduating classes, the total number of graduates from CMU-Q is nearly 800.
 Georgetown University in Qatar (GU-Q). GU-Q was established in 2005. It offers a four-year Bachelor of Science in Foreign Service degree in one of four majors: International Economics, International Politics, Culture and Politics, and International History. A total of 441 students have graduated from GU-Q.
 Northwestern University in Qatar (NU-Q). NU-Q was founded in 2008 and offers Bachelor of Science degrees in Journalism and Strategic Communication, and Communication. It also offers students the opportunity to earn a minor in Middle East Studies and a minor in Media and Politics. Additionally, students can earn a certificate in Strategic Communication. A total of 343 students have graduated from NU-Q.
 HEC Paris in Qatar was established in 2010. Courses on offer include Master's programs, Summer School, MBA, PhD, Executive MBA, TRIUM Global Executive MBA executive short programs, and customized executive education programs for companies. HEC Paris launched Qatar's first international Executive MBA, and also provides a Specialized master's degree in strategic business unit management. A total of 593 students have graduated from HEC Paris in Qatar.
 University College London opened a campus in Qatar in 2010 and after it ended its 10-year contract, UCL left Education City on June 30, 2020. It used to offer a MA in Library and Information Studies and an MA in Museum and Gallery Practice. A total of 254 students have graduated from UCL Qatar.
 Hamad Bin Khalifa University (HBKU). HBKU was founded in 2010. It houses three national research institutes: Qatar Biomedical Research Institute, Qatar Computing Research Institute, and Qatar Environment and Energy Research Institute. HBKU's academic portfolio is tailored to meet the needs of the local community, inspiring Qataris to continue their pursuit of education with a diverse offering of degrees, Master's programs, and PhD courses. HBKU's educational efforts comprise five colleges and an entity devoted to executive education: the College of Health and Life Sciences, College of Humanities & Social Sciences, College of Islamic Studies, College of Law & Public Policy, College of Science & Engineering, and the Executive Education Center.

Basic education 
Other educational centers located at Education City include:
 Qatar Academy (QA) Doha was established in 1995, as Qatar Foundation's first school. It is an International Baccalaureate (IB) World School, accredited by the New England Association of Schools and Colleges, and the Council of International Schools. There are five Qataraadi Academy schools in different locations throughout Qatar, including QA Al Khor, QA Al Wakra QA Msheireb, and QA Sidra.
 Academic Bridge Program (ABP) was established in 2001 and is a rigorous, two-semester general studies program that focuses on English, math, science, and computer skills. Studies in these four areas help ensure students make a successful transition from high school to university.
 Awsaj Academy was established in 1996 and is a K-12 specialized school that addresses the needs of students with mild to moderate learning challenges.
 Renad Academy - was launched in 2016, helping children who have been diagnosed with mild to moderate Autism Spectrum Disorder (ASD).
 Qatar Leadership Academy (QLA), opened in 2005. QLA follows a US curriculum model, with a full high school program in grades 8–12.

Research
Several centers based at Education City focus on science and research. These include:
 Qatar Science & Technology Park, a facility comprising 45,000 square meters of office and laboratory space. It provides incubation, funding, training, mentorship, and connection to the regional and global tech innovation ecosystem.
 Qatar National Research Fund provides financial support and guidance for original, competitively-selected research.
 Sidra Medical and Research Center, a hospital and biomedical research center.

Other centers
Al Shaqab is an equine center.
Doha Debates, a public forum for dialogue which hosts international level debate events in its own unique "majlis" style. 
Mathaf: Arab Museum of Modern Art, houses the ‘Mathaf Collection’, co-owned by Qatar Museums and Qatar Foundation, which is the world's largest specialized collection of its kind.  Oxygen Park is a landscaped open space that incorporates sports, recreation, and heritage in a relatively cool environment. The 130,000-square-metre park was commissioned by Qatar Foundation to be an outdoor oasis for its community and the general public.
QatarDebate, the national debating organization for Qatar.
Qatar National Convention Centre
Education City Mosque, with the capacity to host 1,800 worshippers in its main prayer hall and another 1,000 in its exterior courtyard, it also serves as a community mosque for the surrounding Al Rayyan area.
Premier Inn Doha Education City is a 219 bedroom hotel located in Doha Education City. It is part of the UK based Premier Inn Hotels group which has over 800 hotels in the UK. The hotel has a Costa Coffee shop, an all day dining restaurant, pool and gym and other facilities. The hotel is seamlessly connected to the tram and metro network in Education City and Doha, and also runs a free shuttle bus to Mall of Qatar and within Education City for its guests.

Transport
Three separate stations of the Doha Metro's Green Line (also known as the Education Line) serve Education City: the Education City station, the Qatar National Library station, and the Al Shaqab station. All three stations were opened to the public on 10 December 2019.

Controversy
American universities which have established campuses in Education City have been the subject of ongoing criticism of whether it is appropriate to maintain a campus in Qatar, given the alleged Qatari links to state-sponsored terrorism, the lack of freedom of speech in the country and the country's absolute monarchy. In an interview with Gulf News Journal, Herbert London, president of the London Center for Policy Research and a senior fellow at the Manhattan Institute, said "universities I think have compromised themselves" by having campuses in a country like Qatar where academic freedom and freedom of the press are severely limited.

Along with other universities with campuses in Qatar, Georgetown has received criticism for accepting money from Qatar due to their alleged support of terrorism worldwide and abysmal human rights record, especially in the lead up to the 2022 World Cup. Some question if universities who profit from Qatari campuses are thereby complicit in Qatar's alleged sponsorship of terrorism and human rights abuses. According to the report by US Department of state, Qatari authorities passed anew AML/CFT law that included initiatives on targeted financial sanctions in 2019. The government of Qatar also finalized the new CT legislation in the same year that enhanced penalties for committing acts of terror and enabled the prosecution of Qataris who commit acts of terrorism. Both laws went into effect in February as a part of the counter terrorism policies initiated. Qatar maintains an inter agency National Counter terrorism Committee (NCTC) with representatives from more than 10 government agencies, there were no reported terrorists’ incidents in Qatar since 2020.

Academic freedom
In Qatar, the monarchy has absolute authority over all aspects of life; as such, the nation adheres to a strict interpretation of Islamic sharia. Despite the country itself stating that educational and research institutions have total academic and intellectual freedom.

In 2014, Love Comes Later, a book by Mohanalakshmi Rajakumar, English professor for Georgetown University in Qatar, Northwestern University in Qatar, and Virginia Commonwealth University School of the Arts in Qatar, was banned by the State of Qatar with no explanation. Rajakumar has stated that she wrote the book with the Qatari “sensibilities of the public culture” in mind, meaning that the book did not include the main three objections: sex, atheism, and politics. Some art that has been displayed at VCUarts Qatar has had to be taken down as some Qatari students found it to be disrespectful to their culture, an issue that reflects the differences in conservatism and social practices that are present at the Qatari campus.

In an article by The Washington Post, Susan Dun, an assistant professor of communication at NU-Q said that some professors do exercise caution with statements, written work, or speeches that may reach a wider audience than just the Education City community.

Everette Dennis, the dean of NU-Q, led a six-nation survey in 2015 that was financed by the Qatar National Research Fund and asked questions such as if people think their country is “headed in the right direction”. While the UAE, Egypt, Tunisia, Lebanon and Saudi Arabia all had answers to the question, there was no data from Qatar as the government blocked the question from being asked to survey participants.

Gallery

References

 
Education in Qatar
Doha